Evgeny Lebedev (born December 12, 1957 in Bor, Nizhny Novgorod Oblast) is a Russian political figure and a deputy of the 7th and 8th State Dumas.

From 1978 to 2002, Lebedev worked at the Bor glass factory as a driver, commodity specialist, deputy head of the supply department, head of the supply department, deputy director for commercial issues, deputy general director for marketing and commerce. In 2005-2006, he was the deputy of the Bor City Duma. From 2006 to 2021, he was the deputy of the Legislative Assembly of Nizhny Novgorod Oblast of the 4th-6th convocations. Since September 2021, he has served as deputy of the 8th State Duma.

References

1957 births
Living people
United Russia politicians
21st-century Russian politicians
Eighth convocation members of the State Duma (Russian Federation)
People from Bor, Nizhny Novgorod Oblast